The Philippines participated in the 2009 Asian Martial Arts Games held in Bangkok, Thailand from 1 to 9 August 2009. The said event was also the first and the last of its edition to be held before merging with the Asian Indoor Games and to be later called Asian Indoor and Martial Arts Games starting 2013.

Medalists

Gold

Silver

Bronze

Medal summary

By sports

2009 Asian Martial Arts Games
2009 in Philippine sport